Dimitar Dimitrov (born 20 November 1949) is a former Bulgarian footballer who played as a midfielder.

In 1969, Dimitrov joined Beroe Stara Zagora. In 1975, he signed with CSKA Sofia.

Honours

Club
 CSKA Sofia
 Bulgarian A Group: 1975–76

References

External links 
 

1949 births
Living people
Bulgarian footballers
Bulgaria international footballers
Association football midfielders
First Professional Football League (Bulgaria) players
PFC Beroe Stara Zagora players
PFC CSKA Sofia players
Sportspeople from Haskovo Province